Eburopone is a genus of ants belonging to the family Formicidae.

The species of this genus are found in Africa.

Species
Species:
 Eburopone beanka Borowiec, 2016

References

Ants